The Volunteer Hotel was a pub in the suburb of Balmain in the Inner West of Sydney, in the state of New South Wales, Australia. 

The pub is named because of its association with a group of volunteer firefighters. The fire bell was located across the road in Darling Street and when it rang, the volunteers would gather and proceed on to the fire. Once their work was complete, they would meet at the hotel for refreshment.

The hotel was established before November 1865.

The hotel closed in 1928 and from 1930 was the location of Mrs Riley's confectionery shop. It is now a private residence.

References

 Davidson, B; Hamey, K; Nicholls, D; Called To The Bar - 150 Years of pubs in Balmain & Rozelle, The Balmain Association, 1991, .

Defunct hotels in Sydney
Hotel buildings completed in 1865
Hotels established in 1865
1865 establishments in Australia
1928 disestablishments in Australia
Balmain, New South Wales
Former pubs in Australia